The following is an alphabetical list of members of the United States House of Representatives from the state of Florida.  For chronological tables of members of both houses of the United States Congress from the state (through the present day), see United States congressional delegations from Florida.  The list of names should be complete, but other data may be incomplete.

Current members
As of January 3, 2023

 : Matt Gaetz (R) (since 2017)
 : Neal Dunn (R) (since 2017)
 : Kat Cammack (R) (since 2021)
 : Aaron Bean (R) (since 2023)
 : John Rutherford (R) (since 2017)
 : Michael Waltz (R) (since 2019)
 : Cory Mills (R) (since 2023)
 : Bill Posey (R) (since 2009)
 : Darren Soto (D) (since 2017)
 : Maxwell Frost (D) (since 2023)
 : Daniel Webster (R) (since 2011)
 : Gus Bilirakis (R) (since 2007)
 : Anna Paulina Luna (R) (since 2023)
 : Kathy Castor (D) (since 2007)
 : Laurel Lee (R) (since 2023)
 : Vern Buchanan (R) (since 2007)
 : Greg Steube (R) (since 2019)
 : Scott Franklin (R) (since 2021)
 : Byron Donalds (R) (since 2021)
 : Sheila Cherfilus-McCormick (D) (since 2022)
 : Brian Mast (R) (since 2017)
 : Lois Frankel (D) (since 2010)
 : Jared Moskowitz (D) (since 2023)
 : Frederica Wilson (D) (since 2011)
 : Debbie Wasserman Schultz (D) (since 2005)
 : Mario Díaz-Balart (R) (since 2003)
 : Maria Elvira Salazar (R) (since 2021)
 : Carlos A. Giménez (R) (since 2021)

List of members and delegates

See also

List of United States senators from Florida
United States congressional delegations from Florida
Florida's congressional districts

External links

 
Florida
United States rep